WAYX (1230 AM) is a radio station broadcasting a classic rock format. WAYX serves Ware, Pierce and Brantley Counties in southeast Georgia. WAYX streams at WAYX.com.

WAYX went on the air in 1936, originally on 1200 kHz with 100 watts of power. Over the last 80 years it has gone through several different ownerships before landing with its current owner. The community of license is Waycross, Georgia. The station is owned by Satilla Broadcast Properties, L.L.C.

WAYX formerly aired a news-talk format with Fox Radio News, Georgia Network News and Sports, and popular conservative or political talk shows. Glenn Beck, Rush Limbaugh, Sean Hannity and Neal Boortz were featured on the station, plus business talkers Clark Howard and Dave Ramsey, and computer guru and "digital goddess" Kim Komando. Weekend jazz music programming included Legends of Jazz by Ramsey Lewis and Jazztrax by Art Good. Sports Conversations with Loran Smith and the Regionsbank SEC (Southeastern Conference) football report were carried. The station also partnered with the Waycross-Ware County Chamber of Commerce to provide local event information with its "Community Happenings" and "Community Minute" announcements which aired up to 16 times daily. Vignette programs such as America's Most Wanted, Car Show Minute, National Geographic Environment Minute, the Success Journal and Wisdom Made in America added variety to the lineup. Despite the popularity and variety of the talk programming line-up, the news-talk format on WAYX was cancelled at the end of May 2011 due to lack of listener and advertiser support, and the station began simulcasting WSIZ-FM, Fitzgerald-Douglas to provide that station's 24-7 classic rock format to the Waycross area. This was not commercially successful either, and in July 2016, the station began simulcasting WKBX-FM in Kingsland, Georgia. This broadcast includes country music and Camden County High School and Jacksonville Jaguars football.

Previous logo

References

External links

AYX
Radio stations established in 1936
1936 establishments in Georgia (U.S. state)